Kyrylo Serhiyovych Romanyuk (born 21 March 2001) is a Ukrainian amateur football defender who plays for Lokomotyv Kyiv.

Career
Romanyuk is a product mainly of Dnipro and Shakhtar Donetsk youth sportive school systems.

He made his début for FC Mariupol in the Ukrainian Premier League as a substituted player in the additional time of a match against defending champion FC Shakhtar Donetsk on 1 December 2019.

Personal life
His twin brother Bohdan is also a professional footballer.

References

External links
Profile at the Official UAF Site (Ukr)
 

2001 births
Living people
Footballers from Dnipro
Ukrainian footballers
FC Mariupol players
FC Lokomotyv Kyiv players
Ukrainian Premier League players
Ukrainian Amateur Football Championship players
Association football defenders
Ukrainian twins
Twin sportspeople
Ukraine youth international footballers